Capilla de Santo Medero (Isongo) is a church in Asturias, Spain.

See also
Asturian art
Catholic Church in Spain

References

Churches in Asturias
Roman Catholic chapels in Spain
Bien de Interés Cultural landmarks in Asturias